The 1873 Greenwich by-election was fought on 2 August 1873[20 3].  The byelection was fought due to the death of the incumbent MP of the Liberal Party, David Salomons.  It was won by the Conservative candidate Thomas Boord.

References

Greenwich by-election
Greenwich,1873
Greenwich by-election
Greenwich,1873
Greenwich by-election